This list comprises all players who have participated in at least one league match for AC St. Louis since the team's first season in 2010. Players who were on the roster but never played a first team game are not listed; players who appeared for the team in other competitions (US Open Cup, CONCACAF Champions League, etc.) but never actually made a league appearance are noted at the bottom of the page where appropriate.

A "†" denotes players who only appeared in a single match.

A
  Mike Ambersley

B
  Dillon Barna
  Zach Bauer
  Mark Bloom

C
  Hagop Chirishian
  Troy Cole
  Jeff Cosgriff

D
  Alec Dufty

G
  Gauchinho
  Luis Gil

K
  Elvir Kafedzic
  Manuel Kante
  Luke Kreamalmeyer

L
  John Lesko

M
  Ryan Moore

N
  Christian Nzinga

O
  Anthony O'Garro

P
  Gilbert Pogosyan

R
  Steve Ralston

S
  Chris Salvaggione
  Chris Schuler
  Brad Stisser

T
  Alex Titton
  Jack Traynor

V
  Tim Velten
  Michael Videira

W
  Collen Warner

Sources
AC St. Louis

 
St. Louis
Association football player non-biographical articles